The Grenada Invitational is an annual track and field competition held at the Kirani James Athletic Stadium in St. George's, Grenada as part of the NACAC Outdoor Area Permit Meet Series. 

The Grenada Invitational, with Michael Bascombe as the brainchild and main organiser, was first organised and held on April 8, 2017.

More than 100 athletes competed in the inaugural event which was televised on US Sports Network ESPN.

From its inception to the present day, the Grenada Invitational has attracted world record holders and Olympic medallists. Initially attracting top stars as Kirani James, Justin Gatlin, Kim Collins, Veronica Campbell-Brown, and Asafa Powell while Tori Bowie and Kori Carter were among recent competitors.  Numerous Olympic, World and Commonwealth Championship level athletes continue to take part on an annual basis.

The second staging of the international track and field meet was held on April 21, 2018.

The most recent edition of the Grenada Invitational was held on April 13, 2019.

Meet records

Men

Women

References

External links
 Grenada Invitational

Annual track and field meetings
Athletics competitions in Grenada
Recurring sporting events established in 2017
St. George's, Grenada